USS Lesuth (AK-125) was a  commissioned by the US Navy for service in World War II. Lesuth was named after the star Lesuth in the constellation Scorpius. She was responsible for delivering troops, goods and equipment to locations in the Asiatic-Pacific Theater.

Construction
Lesuth was laid down 24 March 1943, under a Maritime Commission (MARCOM) contract, MC hull No. 1638, as the Liberty ship SS William M. Gwin, by California Shipbuilding Corporation, Terminal Island, Los Angeles, California; launched 17 April 1943; sponsored by Miss M. B. Follis; acquired by the Navy 9 October 1943; renamed Lesuth 11 October 1943; converted at United Engineering, Alameda, California; and commissioned 1 November 1943.

Service history
After loading cargo, Lesuth departed San Pedro, California, 14 November, arriving Pago Pago, Samoa, on 30 November. Four days later she arrived Funafuti, Ellice Islands and for the next 3 months engaged in training exercises in the South Pacific.

Serving South Pacific island bases 
From Funafuti she steamed to the Marshall Islands, arriving Kwajalein 6 March 1944, as a unit of Service Squadron 8. Lesuth remained in the Marshall Islands until she departed Kwajalein 6 August, for Guadalcanal. She loaded cargo in the Solomons and Russell Islands, then sailed from Manus 14 September, en route to the Palau-Western Caroline campaign.

Supporting the Philippine invasion 
The Palau Islands were of strategic importance as an advance base for the invasion of Leyte. The initial landings took place 15 September, 5 days before Lesuth arrived off Kossol Passage. For the next 2 months she remained off Peleliu unloading cargo needed for the Philippine assault. Sailing to Tulagi and Guadalcanal in late November, the cargo ship departed on 26 November for San Francisco, California.
 
After overhaul, Lesuth rejoined Service Squadron 8 at Eniwetok 11 February 1945. Later that month she sailed for the Philippines, arriving San Pedro Bay, Leyte, on 28 February. Following 6 weeks of cargo operations off Leyte, she steamed to the United States during May and June, for additional supplies, then returned to Ulithi 25 July.

End-of-war activity 
When the Japanese surrender ended World War II, Lesuth was used to carry provisions to the occupation troops in the Far East. From September 1945 to May 1946, she made cargo runs to Japan, the Philippines, Okinawa, and Saipan, finally departing Saipan 5 May. Arriving San Francisco, California, on 24 May, Lesuth remained there until 2 July, when she sailed for Pearl Harbor.

Post-war decommissioning 
She decommissioned at Pearl Harbor 16 August 1946. Lesuth was returned to MARCOM 29 May 1947, and was struck from the Navy list 17 July.

Fate
She was placed in the National Defense Reserve Fleet, Suisun Bay Group, until purchased by Union Minerals and Alloys Corporation, on 31 July 1964, for $49,660. She was physically removed from the Reserve Fleet on 8 August 1964.

Awards
Lesuth received one battle star for World War II service. Her crew was eligible for the following medals:
 American Campaign Medal
 Asiatic-Pacific Campaign Medal (1)
 World War II Victory Medal
 Navy Occupation Service Medal (with Asia clasp)
 Philippines Liberation Medal

Notes 

Citations

Bibliography 

Online resources

External links
 

 

Crater-class cargo ships
World War II auxiliary ships of the United States
Ships built in Los Angeles
1943 ships
Suisun Bay Reserve Fleet